San Leon may refer to:

 San Leon, Texas, a census designated place in Texas
 San Leon Energy, an Irish energy company
 San Leon del Amazonas